Combretum kraussii, the forest bushwillow, is a medium-sized to large tree of eastern South Africa, Eswatini and southern Mozambique, which is found within, or in the vicinity of forests. The specific name commemorates Dr. F. Krauss who undertook a collecting trip to South Africa from 1838 to 1840.

Description
The trees are semi-deciduous, as spring leaves only partially replace old foliage. These forest trees become conspicuous in late spring, when the fresh leaves turn to a pale, almost white colour, before returning to green by mid-summer.  In winter the foliage turns partially red or purple, which is shed just before flowering starts. The fresh clusters of four-winged fruit are a colourful red or yellowy red colour, before they dry to mid-brown.

Biochemical
Combretastatin B-1, a type of stilbenoid, can be found in C. kraussii.

Relationships
It is closely related to Combretum nelsonii which occurs in rockier habitats, and bears a resemblance to the larger leaved Combretum woodii, which is similarly distributed, but in bushveld.

Gallery

References

kraussii
Flora of Southern Africa